Oliver W. Fontaine (born 1900) was an American architect from Woonsocket, Rhode Island.

Biography
Oliver Fontaine was born in late 1900 in Woonsocket, Rhode Island to local architect Walter F. Fontaine, then at the beginning of his successful career. He attended the Lowell Textile School, and entered the Fontaine office in 1921, along with his brother, Paul N. Fontaine. In 1935 they were admitted to the firm as partners, as Walter F. Fontaine & Sons. The partnership remained until 1938, when Walter Fontaine died when the Hurricane of 1938 destroyed the family summer home. The firm, now Walter F. Fontaine, Inc., existed until 1942, when Paul joined the war effort.

Upon his brother's departure, Oliver Fontaine established his own Woonsocket office. He practiced alone until 1967, when he added Charles Seavor as partner. Seavor had been a designer in the office since at least 1963, and would lead the office in the 1970s.

Architect Joseph M. Mosher also worked for the Fontaine office in the 1930s and 1940s.

Architectural works

Walter F. Fontaine, Inc., 1938–1942
 1939 – St. Antoine Hospice, 10 Rhodes Ave, North Smithfield, Rhode Island
 Demolished.
 1940 – Morin Heights, Woonsocket, Rhode Island
 1941 – Convent for St. Aloysius R. C. Church, 323 Rathbun St, Woonsocket, Rhode Island
 1942 – Bristol Worsted Mills, 345 Thames St, Bristol, Rhode Island

Oliver W. Fontaine, 1942–1967
 1948 – Barry Memorial Field, 44 Smithfield Rd, Woonsocket, Rhode Island
 1950 – Woonsocket High School Gymnasium, 357 Park Pl, Woonsocket, Rhode Island
 1952 – Ste Jeanne d'Arc School, 68 Dracut St, Lowell, Massachusetts
 1955 – St. Louis de France R. C. Church, 221 W 6th St, Lowell, Massachusetts
 1955 – St. Mary's R. C. School, 30 Broad St, Marlborough, Massachusetts
 1959 – St. James R. C. School, 57 Division St, Manville, Rhode Island
 1960 – St. Joseph's R. C. School, 1210 Mendon Rd, Woonsocket, Rhode Island
 1961 – St. Blaise R. C. Church, 1158 S Main St, Bellingham, Massachusetts
 1961 – St. Frances Xavier Cabrini R. C. Church, 27 Hood Rd, North Scituate, Massachusetts
 1962 – St. Anne R. C. School, 20 Como Rd, Hyde Park, Massachusetts
 1963 – Hope Library, 374 North Rd, Hope, Rhode Island
 1964 – St. Vincent de Paul R. C. School, 6 St Vincent de Paul St, Anthony, Rhode Island
 1964 – Ste. Chretienne Academy (Former), 11 Harrison Rd, Salem, Massachusetts
 Now part of the south campus of Salem State University.
 1966 – Convent for St. Joseph's R. C. Church, 22 Lyman St, Waltham, Massachusetts
 Demolished.

Oliver W. Fontaine Associates, from 1967
 1969 – Joseph L. McCourt Middle School, 45 Highland Ave, Cumberland, Rhode Island

Seavor Associates
 1974 – Our Lady, Queen of Martyrs, R. C. Church, 1409 Park Ave, Woonsocket, Rhode Island
 1974 – Marquette Credit Union Building, 191 Social St, Woonsocket, Rhode Island
 To this day, this is the tallest building in Woonsocket.

References

1900 births
Year of death missing
Architects from Woonsocket, Rhode Island
Architects from Providence, Rhode Island
Lowell Technological Institute alumni